Dark Horse is the sixth studio album by the Canadian rock band Nickelback, released on November 17, 2008 in Europe and the next day elsewhere. It is the follow-up to their multi-platinum selling All the Right Reasons (2005). It was co-produced by the band and producer and songwriter Robert John "Mutt" Lange, known for working with such acts as Foreigner, AC/DC, Bryan Adams, Def Leppard and Shania Twain. Dark Horse sold 326,000 in its first week and debuted at number 2 in the US. More than a year after its release, the album did not leave the Top 100 on the Billboard 200. In its 91st week, the album peaked at number 46 for the week of August 28, 2010. From 9 October, the album stayed at number 71 for 97 consecutive weeks The album spent 125 consecutive weeks inside the Billboard 200. On the week of November 29, 2014, Dark Horse re-entered the Billboard 200 at number 195, more than six years after the album's release.

It was ranked at number 191 on Billboards 200 Albums of the Decade. It is also the band's fourth straight Multi-Platinum selling album in the United States. As of 2010, the album has sold 3 million copies in the United States and 5 million copies worldwide. The album was originally going to be entitled Burn It To The Ground.

Promotion and singles
The first single from the album was "Gotta Be Somebody", which was released online for free digital download on September 29, 2008, for a strict 24-hour period. "If Today Was Your Last Day" had been planned as the lead single but was scrapped at the last minute. The track "Something in Your Mouth" became available for download from the United States iTunes Store on October 28, and was released to US rock radio airplay as the second single from the album on December 15. The song was a hit in 2009 in many countries, such as the United States. In Australia, it received little airplay.

In January 2009, the album's second mainstream single (third overall) was released: "I'd Come for You", with Nigel Dick having made the music video.  Songs "Something in Your Mouth" and "Burn It to the Ground", written by Kroeger, were released only to the rock radio stations in December 2008 and May 2009 respectively.

The exclusive Wal-Mart edition of Dark Horse included a link to download an MP3 from Nickelback's performance of "This Afternoon" on Walmart Soundcheck.

The album won numerous accolades at the 2009 Juno Awards, winning three out of five of its nominated awards including "Rock Album of the Year".

Dark Horse was certified platinum by the Recording Industry Association of America (RIAA) on December 9, 2008, only three weeks after its North American release. The album also remained in the top 20 on the Billboard 200 for weeks after its release. The album was certified two times platinum in April 2009, and had by April 2010 sold over 3 million copies in the U.S.
Burn it to the Ground was also nominated for Best Hard Rock Performance at the 52nd Grammy Awards but lost to AC/DC's "War Machine".
On September 13, 2010, the album re-entered the German Albums Chart at No. 30, 21 months after its debut and almost 6 months after its last entry on that chart.

Critical reception

According to Metacritic, the album received mixed reviews from critics, scoring 49 out of 100. Conversely, it received the Juno Award for Album of the Year, a category whose nominees are the top five selling Canadian releases of the year.

Stephen Thomas Erlewine of Allmusic gave Dark Horse 1.5/5, writing, "Dark Horse is constructed entirely from the group's standard power ballad and hard rock templates, the mood only lightening when Kroeger and company take a break to kick back on 'This Afternoon.'" 

Entertainment Weekly reviewer Leah Greenblatt wrote, "It's hard not to be put off by the execrable lyrics of album opener "Something in Your Mouth" (the song is basically kryptonite for feminists)." PopMatters criticised the band's release, giving it 3/10 and saying it was a step down from previous albums: "Dark Horse finds the group at a creative low point. Each song sounds like an older, better Nickelback hit, and Kroeger only once displays his prior songwriting strength with the sad-bastard portrait 'Just to Get High'." The Guardian awarded the album one out of five stars, being particularly negative of the band's cliché style; "Nickelback's music reaffirms every sex-and-stupidity cliche hard rock can offer."

Rolling Stone gave the album a positive review, complimenting its production, writing "Mutt Lange lightens Nickelback's dreary post-grunge plod, applying guitar shimmer to prom ballads and detonating big beats under frat-party shouts and raplike vocal parts." Whilst ChartAttack credited the band's success to knowing its target audience: "Chad Kroeger is a genius because he knows exactly what people want and precisely how far he can go. He turned out an extremely racy album that's loaded with songs about gettin' drunk and doin' it all without breaking any taboos, and with enough love and moral authority to grease its passage into the mainstream. Rejoice, North America. This is your world." Billboard also praised the album's content: "The bulletproof Nickelback provides affordable fun that promises good returns in hard times."

Track listing

Wal-Mart exclusive bonus track
"This Afternoon" (Original Performance Series) – 4:26

Australian singles
 "Gotta Be Somebody"
 "I'd Come for You"
 "If Today Was Your Last Day"
 "Never Gonna Be Alone"
 "Burn It to the Ground"
 "This Afternoon"

Personnel
Nickelback
Chad Kroeger – lead vocals, lead guitar, rhythm guitar on "If Today Was Your Last Day"
Ryan Peake – rhythm guitar, backing vocals, lead guitar on "If Today Was Your Last Day"
Mike Kroeger – bass
Daniel Adair – drums, backing vocals

Production
Mutt Lange – production
Joey Moi – production, mixing on "Gotta Be Somebody", "Never Gonna Be Alone" and "This Afternoon"
Randy Staub – mixing
Zach Blackstone – mixing assistance
Chris Lord-Alge – mixing on "I'd Come for You"
Nik Karpen – mixing assistance on "I'd Come for You"
Keith Armstrong – mixing assistance on "I'd Come for You"
Mike Shipley – mixing on "If Today Was Your Last Day"
Brian Wohlgemuth – mixing assistance on "If Today Was Your Last Day"
Ted Jensen – mastering
Olle Romo – editing, additional engineering
Scott Cooke – editing, additional engineering

Charts

Weekly charts

Year-end charts

Decade-end charts

Certifications

Tour

Release history

Appearances 
 The song "Something in Your Mouth" was featured in the film American Pie Presents: The Book of Love in 2009.
The song "Burn It to the Ground" was featured in the movie Transformers: Revenge of the Fallen and on film's album in 2009, in the video games NHL 10 in 2009 and WWE SmackDown vs. Raw 2011 in 2010, and in a trailer for the movie Date Night in 2010. Both it and "This Afternoon" were featured as downloadable content for the video game Rock Band in 2010, while "If Today Was Your Last Day" was later included in 2011. Nickelback themselves even performed it during the closing ceremony for the 2010 Olympic Winter Games in Vancouver.

References

External links
 Nickelback official site
 First Russian site about Nickelback
 Nickelback Italian Site and Forum

Nickelback albums
2008 albums
Roadrunner Records albums
Albums produced by Robert John "Mutt" Lange
Albums produced by Joey Moi
Juno Award for Album of the Year albums